Grasset may refer to:

People 
 André Grasset (1758-1792), Canadian-born French priest, martyr
 Bernard Grasset (publisher) (1881–1955), French founder of publishing house Éditions Grasset and nephew of writer Bernard Privat
 Bernard Grasset (politician) (born 1933), French politician, former High Commissioner of New Caledonia
 Claude Sosthène Grasset d'Orcet (1828–1900), French archaeologist and writer
 Dalixia Fernández Grasset (born 1977), Cuban beach volleyball player
 Eugène Grasset (1845–1917), Swiss decorative artist and creator of the Grasset typeface
 Jean-Jacques Grasset (c.1769–1839), French violinist
 Joseph Grasset (1849–1918), French neurologist and parapsychological investigator
 Nicole Grasset (1927–2009), Swiss-French medical virologist and microbiologist-epidemiologist
 Raymond Grasset (1892-1968), French politician

Toponyms
Grasset Lake, Quebec, Canada

Other 
 Collège André-Grasset, pre-university college in Montreal, Quebec, Canada
 Éditions Grasset, French publishing house founded in 1907 by Bernard Grasset
 Grasset typeface, created by the French type foundry G. Peignot et Fils